"The Galactus Trilogy" is a 1966 three-issue comic book story arc that appeared in Fantastic Four #48-50. Written, co-plotted and drawn by Jack Kirby with editor Stan Lee for Marvel Comics, it introduced the characters Galactus and the Silver Surfer. In 2018, The Atlantic called it "the indisputable pinnacle of the so-called Silver Age of comic books".

Publication history
In 1966, nearly five years after launching Marvel Comics' flagship superhero title, Fantastic Four, Kirby and Lee collaborated on an antagonist designed to break from the era's archetypal mold of supervillains, and instead be a being of god-like stature and power. As Lee recalled in 1993, 
 

Kirby described his Biblical inspirations for Galactus and an accompanying character, an angelic Herald Lee dubbed the Silver Surfer:

Kirby further explained, "Galactus in actuality is a sort of god. He is beyond reproach, beyond anyone's opinion. In a way he is kind of a Zeus, who fathered Hercules. He is his own legend, and of course, he and the Silver Surfer are sort of modern legends, and they are designed that way."

Writer Mike Conroy expanded on Lee and Kirby's explanation: "In five short years from the launch of the Fantastic Four, the Lee/Kirby duo...had introduced a whole host of alien races or their representatives...there were the Skrulls, the Watcher and the Stranger, all of whom Lee and Kirby used in the foundations of the universe they were constructing, one where all things were possible but only if they did not flout the 'natural laws' of this cosmology. In the nascent Marvel Universe, characters acted consistently, whatever comic they were appearing in. Their actions reverberated through every title. It was pure soap opera but on a cosmic scale, and Galactus epitomized its epic sweep."

All this led to the introduction of Galactus in Fantastic Four #48-50 (March–May 1966), which fans began calling "The Galactus Trilogy". It culminated in Fantastic Four #50 (May 1966), which featured the Silver Surfer interceding on behalf of humankind against Galactus.

Plot summary

"The Coming of Galactus!"
After wrapping up the Inhumans story of the previous issue, the story moves to the Silver Surfer as he soars through the Andromeda Galaxy, earning the attention of the Skrulls. Terrified, the Skrulls do everything they can to conceal their world from the Surfer's perceptions, explaining to an inexperienced Skrull that wherever the Silver Surfer appears, his master, Galactus, cannot be far behind.

Back on Earth, the Fantastic Four witness the entire skyline appearing to be engulfed in flame. At the Baxter Building, Reed sequesters himself inside his laboratory to analyze the situation. The flames in the sky dissipate, giving way to an unending field of space debris.

The powerful being known as the Watcher appears inside Reed's laboratory. He explains that he is responsible for the atmospheric disturbances, for he has been attempting to conceal Earth's existence from the attention of the Silver Surfer. He further explains that the Surfer is the advance scout of Galactus, a powerful cosmic being that consumes the elemental energies of entire worlds, leaving them as little more than dried, lifeless husks.

The Surfer investigates the Watcher's debris field and finds Earth hidden beneath it. He flies to the roof of the Baxter Building and sends out a cosmic signal for Galactus. The Fantastic Four race to the top of the building, and the Thing rams into the Surfer, knocking him off the building. In the sky above, Galactus' planet-devouring world ship emerges over Manhattan. The giant Galactus exits the ship and declares his intention to consume the entire world.

"If This Be Doomsday!"
The Watcher tries to appeal to Galactus to leave Earth alone. When diplomacy proves not to work, the Human Torch and the Thing try to attack Galactus to no effect. The Watcher tells them to return to their base and he will contact them shortly.

Galactus continues to assemble his planet-devouring device and the Watcher explains that there is a device upon Galactus' home planet that could stop him. Meanwhile, the unconscious Silver Surfer wakes up in the apartment of Alicia Masters. She learns of the Surfer's mission and appeals to him to turn against his master and help save the Earth.

When the Fantastic Four begin attacking Galactus' almost completed device, the planet-eater sends his cyborg Punisher to keep them out of his way while he repairs it. Making use of this distraction and delay, the Watcher boosts Johnny's powers so that he may travel to Galactus' planet and retrieve the weapon they need to defeat the world-devourer. Alicia convinces the Surfer to help save the Earth.

"The Startling Saga of the Silver Surfer!"
The Silver Surfer arrives to attack his former master, giving Johnny the time he needs to return from Galactus' planet with the Ultimate Nullifier. When Reed threatens to use it against Galactus, the planet-eater agrees to spare the Earth and leave if Reed gives him back the weapon. True to his word, Galactus leaves, but not before making it so the Surfer can never leave the Earth, by removing his "space-time powers". After the battle, before the Silver Surfer can leave and come to know his sudden new home, Alicia thanks him for his help, causing the jealous Thing to think that she is choosing the Surfer over him. He quietly walks away, feeling nothing but rejection, before Alicia has a chance to introduce him with pride.

As life returns to normal, the press dismisses the Galactus fiasco as a hoax.

Legacy
 "The Galactus Trilogy" served as a primary inspiration for the 2007 film Fantastic Four: Rise of the Silver Surfer.
The story arc was used as the basis for Ultimate Marvel's Ultimate Galactus Trilogy, a trilogy of three miniseries written by Warren Ellis.
The story arc was the basis for the third issue of the Marvels four-issue comic book limited series written by Kurt Busiek, painted by Alex Ross and edited by Marcus McLaurin, and published by Marvel Comics in 1994.
 The story arc was adapted into episodes of the 1967 Fantastic Four TV series and the 1994 Fantastic Four TV series.
 The story arc was also loosely adapted into the first three-part episode of the TV series Silver Surfer. 
 The story arc was voted the 19th best comic book storyline by a reader poll at Comic Book Resources.
 The story arc's popularity sparked additional appearances by the Silver Surfer in later issues, and he would eventually receive his own comic book series.

Collected editions
"The Galactus Trilogy" has been collected numerous times:

References

External links

Hatfield, Charles, The Galactus Trilogy: An Appreciation (in The Jack Kirby Collector #9, collected in The Collected Jack Kirby Collector Volume 1, 2004)
 

Comics by Jack Kirby
Comics by Stan Lee
Silver Surfer